Hube may refer to:

 65657 Hube, asteroid
 Hube (name)
 Hube (ridge), hill range in the Leine Uplands of Germany 
 Hube Rural LLG in Papua New Guinea